Risdam is a neighborhood in the northwest of Hoorn, Netherlands. The name was derived from Rijsdam, a dam in the historic waterway that ran along the Keern. Today, the neighborhood is split into the districts Risdam-Noord, Risdam-Zuid and Nieuwe Steen. Risdam-Noord formally belongs to the village of Zwaag.

Risdam had a total population of 17,645 in 2019. In the southwestern part of the neighborhood, there is a sports and leisure center with an ice skating rink, a movie theater, a hotel, a casino and a running track. The city hall of Hoorn is located in the southeast of the neighborhood.

References 

Hoorn
Populated places in North Holland